Krishnapuram is a village in Dattirajeru mandal in the Vizianagaram district of Andhra Pradesh, India. It has a population of 2,160 people.

See also 
Bobbili mandal

Villages in Vizianagaram district